MF Norwegian School of Theology, Religion and Society, formerly the Free Faculty of Theology and MF Norwegian School of Theology, is an accredited Norwegian specialized university focused on theology, religion, education and social studies, located in Oslo, Norway. It is one of three private specialized universities in Norway, alongside VID and BI.

Overview

MF was founded in 1907 as an independent theological institution at university level and is Norway's largest provider of theological education and research. MF has around 110 employees, 1300 bachelor and master students and about 60 Ph.D. students.

Since 1967, MF has offered academic studies in Christianity and religion for use in school and society. As needs have arisen, MF has developed a broad portfolio of professional degrees for church and school. The religious demography of Norway has changed significantly. There is an increasing need and demand for knowledge and quality in research on, education in and communication about religion and society. MF meets this challenge through interdisciplinary research on religion and society, along with relevant bachelor, master and Ph.D. degrees in theology, religion and society.

MF has two centers:

MF KOM – Center for Excellence in Research, Development and Communication for Church and Congregation. This center is an intermediary between scholars at MF and church workers who wish to utilize MF's competency in their own contexts.

MF Center for the Advanced Study of Religion, MF CASR, organizes the research on religion done at MF. It facilitates joint projects between MF and other institutions. MF CASR encompasses areas of research including religious studies, history of religion, philosophy of religion, texts and manuscript research, cultural and art history, along with sociology of religion.

Norwegian Philological Institute (PHI) is affiliated with and located at MF. The cooperation involves offering courses in classical languages connected with major world religions and cultures.

MF's areas of activity are education, research and communication.

Beginning as a confessional school, today it is an ecumenical inclusive school offering education specific to a number of denominations (Lutheran, Methodist, Catholic, Salvation Army and Pentecostal).

History 

MF was founded in 1907 by a body of people (Norwegian academics, politicians, clergy and lay people) wanting to build the education and research on the Holy Scriptures and the Lutheran Confessions.

The main reason for the school's establishment was an appointment to a professorship at the Faculty of Theology at University of Oslo. The chair of Systematic Theology was vacant after the death of Fredrik Petersen in 1903, and in 1906 the liberal theologian Johannes Ording was appointed to the Chair. Ording was appointed after a lengthy debate which almost led to a crisis in the Government of Norway. It was not supported by the other leading professors at the faculty, and Sigurd Odland at the Faculty of Theology and the Minister of Church Affairs Christopher Knudsen in the government left their positions following the appointment.

Notable members of society and the church gathered around Odland and then took steps to found an independent institution training the clergy. The founding charter was signed October 16, 1907, and the school was opened in the autumn of 1908 with only eight students (a number that increased to fourteen before the end of the first term). The earliest teachers were Sigurd Odland (New Testament), Edvard Sverdrup (church history), Peter Hognestad (Old Testament), Ole Hallesby (systematic theology). From 1919, academic staff members were granted the right to call themselves professors.

The school grew steadily, and in 1913 MF was given the right to offer degrees in theology, as well as in practical theology from 1925. The school expanded in 1967 and an institute of Christian theology was founded, giving a minor, major and a master's degree in Christian Studies. 1977 the school started to train Christian educators (catechists).
A major step was the right in 1990 to award doctoral degrees. The school was the first private school given the right to do this, and in 2005 the school was accredited as a specialized university institution by the Norwegian authorities. In 2018 the school changed its name from MF Norwegian School of Theology to MF Norwegian School of Theology, Religion and Society.

Academics 
MF Norwegian School of Theology, Religion and Society awards the following degrees: bachelor, master, candidatus/a theologiae and Ph.D.

It offers the following programmes of study that result in the mentioned degrees:
 At undergraduate level
 Introductory Studies in Christianity and Religious and Ethical Education (1 year),
 Introductory Studies in Social Studies (1 year),
 Introductory Studies in Cross-cultural Communication (1 year),
 Bachelor of Arts (BA), specializing in Christianity and Religious and Ethical Education (3 years),
 Bachelor of Arts, specializing in Religion and Society (3 years),
 Bachelor of Arts, specializing in Youth Ministry (3 years),
 Bachelor of Arts, specializing in Social Sciences (3 years),
 Bachelor of Theology (3 years).
 At postgraduate level
 Master of Arts (MA) in Religious Education (1 ½ years, part-time studies),
 Master of Arts in Religion, Society and Global Issues (2 years, offered in English),
 Master of Arts in History of Religions (2 years, offered in English),
 Master of Theology (Th.M.) (2 years, offered in English) specializing in Hebrew Bible/Old Testament Studies, New Testament Studies, Church History, or Theology, Mission and Society,
 Master of Theology (5 years, one-tier, together with BA degree),
 Master of Philosophy (Ph.M) in Religious Education (2 years),
 Master of Philosophy in Educational Ministry (2 years),
 Master of Philosophy in Diaconal Ministry (2 years),
 Master of Practical Theology,
 Master of Christian Clinical Counseling,
 Professional Degree in Theology and Ministry (6 years, leading to the cand.theol.-degree),
 Professional Teaching Degree in Religious Education and Social Studies lektor/adjunkt.
 At PhD level
 Philosophiae doctor (Ph.D.) in Theology (3 ½ years), specializing in Hebrew Bible/Old Testament Studies, New Testament Studies, Church History, or Theology, Mission and Society.
 Philosophiae doctor (Ph.D.) in Religious Education (3 ½ years).

Notable alumni and faculty staff

Alumni 

 Andreas Grasmo

Politicians 

 Kjell Magne Bondevik
 Valgerd Svarstad Haugland
 Torild Skogsholm
 Helen Bjørnøy.

Musicians 

 Bjørn Eidsvåg
 Morten Harket

Authors 

 Jan Kjærstad
 Ole Hallesby

Clergy 

 Helga Haugland Byfuglien, Presiding Bishop in the Church of Norway
 Ole Christian Kvarme, Bishop of Oslo
 Gunnar Stålsett, Bishop Emeritus of Oslo
 Andreas Aarflot, Bishop Emeritus of Oslo
 Stein Reinertsen, Bishop of Agder and Telemark
 Olav Skjevesland, Bishop Emeritus of Agder and Telemark
 Halvor Bergan, Bishop Emeritus of Agder and Telemark
 Per Arne Dahl, Bishop of Tunsberg
 Laila Riksaasen Dahl, Bishop Emeritus of Tunsberg
 Olav Øygard, Bishop of Nord Hålogaland
 Per Oskar Kjølaas, Bishop Emeritus of Nord Hålogaland
 Erling Pettersen, Bishop of Stavanger
 Ernst Baasland, Bishop Emeritus of Stavanger
 Tor Singsaas, Bishop of Nidaros
 Herborg Finnset, Bishop of Nidaros
 Finn Wagle, Bishop Emeritus of Nidaros
 Halvor Nordhaug, Bishop of Bjørgvin
 Ole D. Hagesæther, Bishop Emeritus of Bjørgvin
 Ingeborg Midttømme, Bishop of Møre
 Odd Bondevik, Bishop Emeritus of Møre
 Atle Sommerfelt, Bishop of Borg
 Per Lønning, Bishop Emeritus of Borg and Bjørgvin
 Solveig Fiske, Bishop of Hamar
 Tor Berger Jørgensen, Bishop of Sør-Hålogaland
 Øystein I. Larsen, Bishop Emeritus of Sør-Hålogaland
 Olav Fykse Tveit, General Secretary, World Council of Churches
 Trond Bakkevig, Canon, Provost of Vestre Aker

Faculty staff

Old Testament theology 
 
 Gard Granerød
 Andrew Wergeland, Hebrew
 
 Magne Sæbø

New Testament theology 
 
 
 Ole Jacob Filtvedt
 Hanne B. S. Tveito
 Glenn Wehus, Greek
 Morten Hørning Jensen
 Ernst Oddvar Baasland

Church history 
 , Medieval Church History and Culture
 , Reformation and Early Modern History
 Vidar Leif Haanes (rector)
 Victor Ghica, Antiquity and Early Christian Studies
 Kristin Norseth, Norwegian Church and Mission History
 John Wayne Kaufman, Patristics and Early Christian Studies
 Oskar Skarsaune
 Bernt T. Oftestad
 Andreas Aarflot

Systematic theology 
 , Contemporary Theology
 Harald Hegstad, Dogmatics and Practical Ecclesiology
 Gunnar H. Heiene, Ethics
 Svein Olaf Thorbjørnsen, Ethics
 , Systematic Theology
 , Diakonia, Religion, Society
 Terje Hegertun, Systematic Theology
 , Catholic Theology
 Trond Bakkevig, Religion and Society
 Ivar Asheim, Systematic Theology
 , Systematic Theology
 Lars Østnor, Theological Ethics
 Kjell Olav Sannes, Dogmatics
 Peder Gravem, Christian and Religious Studies
 Marion S. Grau, Systematic Theology and Missiology

Religious studies 
 
 Trine Anker, Religious Studies, Education
 Arild Romarheim
 Ann Midttun

Social sciences and religious education 
 , Religious Education
 Geir Afdal, Religious Education
 , Religious Education
 , Diakonia, Social Science
 Lars Laird Eriksen, Social Science
 Janicke Heldal Stray, Social Science, Education
 Håkon W. Lorentzen, Social Science
 Gry Stålsett, Psychology of Religion
 Leif Gunnar Engedal, Psychology of Religion

Practical theology and missiology 

 Lars Johan Danbolt, Pastoral Counseling, Psychology of Religion
 Roar Fotland, Missiology
 Tone S. Kaufman, Practical Theology
 Erling Birkedal, Congregational Development
 Knud Jørgensen, Missiology
 Astrid Sandsmark, Youth Ministry
 Tron Fagermoen, Diaconia
 Sjur Isaksen, Pastoral Counseling
 , Liturgy
 Hallvard Mosdøl, Homiletics
 Idun Strøm Sefland, Pastoral Training
 Fredrik Saxegaard, Homiletics
 Knud Jørgensen, Missiology
 Jeppe Bach Nikolajsen, Missiology
 , Missiology
 Olav Skjevesland, Practical Theology

References

External links 
 Det teologiske Menighetsfakultet Official website

 
Church of Norway
Education in Oslo
Religion in Oslo
Seminaries and theological colleges in Norway
Universities and colleges in Norway
Educational institutions established in 1907
1907 establishments in Norway
Christian seminaries and theological colleges